A statue of William Lloyd Garrison by Olin Levi Warner is installed along Commonwealth Avenue, in Boston, Massachusetts, United States. It was designed in 1885, cast in 1886, installed on May 13 of that year. The bronze sculpture measures approximately 7 ft. x 4 ft. x 6 ft. 4 in., and rests on a Quincy granite designed by John M. Wells that measures approximately 4 ft. 9 in. x 4 ft. x 6 ft. 4 in. The memorial was surveyed as part of the Smithsonian Institution's "Save Outdoor Sculpture!" program in 1993.

References

External links

 

1880s sculptures
1886 establishments in Massachusetts
Bronze sculptures in Massachusetts
Granite sculptures in Massachusetts
Monuments and memorials in Boston
Outdoor sculptures in Boston
Sculptures of men in Massachusetts
Statues in Boston